Svatove or Svatovo is a city on the Krasna river in Eastern Ukraine currently occupied by Russia as part of Luhansk People's Republic. 

It serves as the administrative headquarters of Svatove Raion.

History
After the proclamation of the separatist Luhansk People's Republic on 27 April 2014, Luhansk Oblast became a battlefield of the War in Donbas. Svatove stayed under Ukrainian governmental control. The separatist referendum on 11 May on independence was not held in the city.

On 29–30 October 2015, two people were reported dead and eight wounded as a result of explosions caused by fire at the munitions depot in Svatove.

2022 invasion

During the 2022 Russian invasion of Ukraine, Svatove was occupied by Russian and Luhansk People's Republic forces on 6 March 2022. Following a major counteroffensive by Ukrainian forces in early September 2022, it was reported that Russian forces were leaving the city. On 14 September it was reported that Russian troops had returned.

Governance
 the city has been occupied by Russian forces.

Geography
The city lies in the valley of the Krasna river, with wooded hills to the east and west.

Demography
In 2021 it had a population of 16,420. At the time of the 2001 census, 89.87% of the population were ethnic Ukrainians and 8.61% identified as Russians.

Economy
The town primarily serves the surrounding agricultural area, with some metal working, textiles and light industry. There is a processing plant for sunflower oil that was built in 1902-3.

Culture and community
A local newspaper has been published in the city since September 1931. The Svatove district museum of local history was founded in 1962 and has over 10,000 objects.

Landmarks
The former Theological Seminary is now the Number 1 Secondary School. There is a Memorial of Glory, Memory and Sorrow in the centre of the city, and a steam locomotive monument on Pryvokzalny Square.

Transport
The town occupies a strategic location at the heart of the Krasna valley, where the P07 road running SE-NW from Starobilsk to Kupiansk crosses the river and meets the P66 road from Kreminna.
In 1894 a railway was built from Lysychansk and in 1895 it was extended to Kupiansk. It is now part of the Donets Railway.

Education
There are five secondary schools and five primary schools.

Religious sites
There is a Church of the Assumption of the Blessed Virgin Mary.

Sport
There is a specialist sports school.

Notable people

Climate

See also
 Battle of Svatove - 2022 battle for the town

References

Cities in Luhansk Oblast
Cities of district significance in Ukraine
Cities and towns built in the Sloboda Ukraine
Explosions in 2015
Explosions in Ukraine
2015 in Ukraine
Svatove Raion